Jan-Peter Peckolt (born 4 May 1981 in Ludwigshafen) is a German sailor. He won a bronze medal in 49er class at the 2008 Summer Olympics.

References 

German male sailors (sport)
Medalists at the 2008 Summer Olympics
Olympic sailors of Germany
Olympic bronze medalists for Germany
1981 births
Living people
Olympic medalists in sailing
Sailors at the 2008 Summer Olympics – 49er
Sportspeople from Ludwigshafen